Mirnalini Ravi (born 10 May) is an Indian actress who works predominantly in Tamil language films. She made her acting debut in a supporting role with 2019 Tamil film Super Deluxe, and subsequently made her debut as a female lead in Champion (2019), and Telugu debut with Gaddalakonda Ganesh (2019).

Early life 
Mirnalini was born in Pondicherry. She graduated in engineering in Bangalore and worked as a software professional in Bangalore for IBM.

Career 
Mrinalini began uploading TikTok and Dubsmash videos, which went viral. Her film career began when director Thiagarajan Kumararaja, looked at one of those videos and called her for an audition for the film Super Deluxe (2019). She played the lead actress in Suseenthiran's Champion (2019). She made her Telugu film debut with 2019 film Gaddalakonda Ganesh and starred opposite Atharvaa. In a review of the film by The Times of India, the reviewer wrote that "Mrinalini delivers an impressive performance in the screen time she has". Mirnalini Ravi also appeared as the lead actress in Ponram's MGR Magan (2021), and a supporting actress in Ajay Gnanamuthu's Cobra. Ravi appeared in lead role in the Tamil movie Enemy (2021). And She got famous for her dance steps from the song “Tum Tum” in the film, and her next release was Jango, marking the first Tamil Time - loop film. The film received mixed to positive reviews from critics.

Filmography

Films
 All films are in Tamil unless otherwise noted.

Awards and nominations

References

External links 
 

Living people
Actresses in Tamil cinema
Actresses in Telugu cinema
Indian film actresses
21st-century Indian actresses
Actresses from Puducherry
People from Pondicherry
Year of birth missing (living people)